The 1941–42 Duke Blue Devils men's basketball team represented Duke University during the 1941–42 men's college basketball season. The head coach was Eddie Cameron, coaching his 14th and final season with the Blue Devils. The team finished with an overall record of 22–2.

References 

Duke Blue Devils men's basketball seasons
Duke
1941 in sports in North Carolina
1942 in sports in North Carolina